Anadarko is a city in Caddo County, Oklahoma, United States. The city is fifty miles southwest of Oklahoma City. The population was 5,745 at the 2020 census. It is the county seat of Caddo County.

History

Anadarko got its name when its post office was established in 1873.  The designation came from the Nadaco Native Americans, a branch of the Caddo Nation, and the "A" was added due to a clerical error.

In 1871, the Wichita Agency was reestablished on the north bank of the Washita River after being destroyed in the American Civil War.  The Wichita Agency administered the affairs of the Wichita, Caddo and other tribes.  In 1878, the Kiowa-Comanche Agency at Fort Sill was consolidated with the Wichita Agency.

In 1901, the federal government allotted the lands of the Kiowa, Comanche and Arapaho Reservations, and opened the surplus land to white settlement.  On August 6, 1901, an auction was held for homesteads and town lots.  Around 5,000 people were living in "Rag Town" on the east edge of Anadarko awaiting the auction.  Although 20,000 people were present for auction day, Anadarko's population dwindled to 2,190 in 1907.

Agriculture has been the principal driver of the local economy, since the Washita Valley has been good for crops and livestock. The second pillar of the local economy has been Native American affairs.

Listing as National Register of Historic Places
Anadarko Downtown Historic District was designated as a National Register of Historic Places with the National Park Service on December 10, 1990.
 ☆

Geography

Climate

Demographics

As of the census of 2020, there were 5,745 people living in the city. The population density was 948.5 people per square mile (361.9/km).  There were 2,800 housing units at an average density of 390.2 per square mile (150.7/km). The racial makeup of the city was 36% White, 40.4% Native American, 6% African American, 1.1% Asian, 11.2% Hispanic or Lationo, and 14.7% from two or more races.

Culture

Native American significance

Anadarko, the self-titled "Indian Capital of the Nation."  It is the capital of the Wichita and Affiliated Tribes, the Delaware Nation and the Apache Tribe of Oklahoma.  The city houses the National Hall of Fame for Famous American Indians.

Anadarko is named after the Nadaco, a Caddo band now affiliated with the Caddo Nation.  In the Caddo language, Nadá-kuh means "bumblebee place".  The Caddo are a federally recognized Native American tribe for which Caddo County is named.  Caddo County is part of the former reservation of the Caddo, Wichita, and Delaware Nation, prior to allotment in the post-Dawes Allotment Era.

Culturally, Anadarko is rare among Oklahoma cities as Native Americans form a near-majority.  Locals are often familiar with a few basic Indian words, such as haw-nay, Kiowa for "no." Wichita and Apache words are sometimes employed in casual conversation as well, such as hangy, ah-ho, ebote, and bocote. Native American motifs are commonly used for design, art, and other aspects of daily life.

Anadarko has a Bureau of Indian Affairs office. The town is situated between the Wichita, Caddo, and Delaware reservations to the north, and the Kiowa, Comanche, and Apache reservations to the south. These reservations were dismantled by the allotment of tribal lands to individual members, and the opening of the "excess" lands to settlement, in a series of land openings.  The area surrounded by Anadarko was opened to settlement by a 1901 land lottery affecting the Kiowa, Comanche, Wichita and Caddo lands.

The Anadarko area is home to Riverside Indian School, a Bureau of Indian Education boarding and day school for Native American students.

Education
Anadarko Public Schools consists of three elementary schools, Sunset Elementary, East Elementary, and Mission Elementary; a middle school; and a high school. There are approximately 1,950 students.

Riverside Indian School is near Anadarko.

Notable people

 Richard Aitson (1953-2022), a Kiowa-Kiowa Apache bead artist, curator, and poet
 Black Beaver (1806—1880), Delaware Native American leader, scout, and rancher
 Blackbear Bosin (1921-1980), Comanche-Kiowa artist
 John Emhoolah Jr. (1929-2021), Kiowa educational activist
Ronald D. Godard, ambassador 
 Derrell Griffith (b. 1943), former Major League Baseball player
 Ralph B. Hodges (1930-2013), former Chief Justice of the Oklahoma Supreme Court
 Genta H. Holmes (b. 1940), first United States Ambassador to Namibia
 Butch Huskey (b. 1971), former Major League Baseball player
 Charles Leonhard (1915-2002), music educator and academic
 Doris McLemore (1927–2016) last fluent speaker of the Wichita language
 Cal McLish (1925-2010), Major League Baseball player
 Stephen Mopope (1900-1974), Kiowa artist
 Gary Nixon (1941-2011), national champion motorcycle racer
 Ray Gene Smith (1928–2005), football player
 Jim Thompson (1906-1977), author and screenwriter
 Gene Tracy (1927–1979), comedian, emcee, and recording artist
 Louis Weller (1904-1979), National Football League player

References

External links

 City of Anadarko
 Anadarko Chamber of Commerce
 Encyclopedia of Oklahoma History and Culture - Anadarko (Town)
 "Daily Democrat" newspaper  hosted by the Gateway to Oklahoma History.

Cities in Oklahoma
Cities in Caddo County, Oklahoma
County seats in Oklahoma